The Far Islands and Other Cold Places is a collection of travel essays from Norway, Scotland, the Faroe Islands, Greenland, Canada and Alaska.  It was written in the period between 1888 and 1919 by the painter Elizabeth Taylor. It was republished in 1997 by Pogo Press.

American travel books
1997 non-fiction books